The 2013–2014 Jordanian Pro League (known as the Al-Manaseer Jordanian Pro League, named after Ziad AL-Manaseer Companies Group for sponsorship reasons) season was the 62nd since its establishment. The season began on 13 September 2013 and concluded in May 2014. A total of twelve teams participated in the league. Shabab Al-Ordon were the title holders. Al-Wehdat won its 13th title    on 22 May 2014 after defeating That Ras 2–0 at King Abdullah Stadium.

Teams

Map

League table

Results

Relegation play-off

Season statistics

Top goalscorers

References

External links
Official website

Jordanian Pro League seasons
Jordan
1